Jul hos mig includes five duets, and was released on 11 November 2009 and is Lotta Engberg's first Christmas album. The album peaked at second place at the Swedish album chart, and sold gold.

The song "Äntligen december" was tested for Svensktoppen, and entered the chart on 13 December 2009. The upcoming week, the song had been knocked out of chart.

Track listing

Contributing musicians
Jörgen Ingeström - Keyboards, guitars and programming (all songs, except "Julen för mig)
Bo Reimer - programmering (all songs, except "Julen för mig)
Johan Franzon - drums (all songs, except "Julen för mig)
Ove Andersson - bass (all songs, except "Julen för mig)
Britt Bergström - choir (track 1, 3, 5, 7, 10, 11, 12)
Johan Alenius - saxophone tenor (track 1, 7, 12), saxophone (track 10, 13)
Anders Sjögren - alto saxophone och baritone saxophone (track 1, 7, 12)
Mikael Andefjärd - trombone (track 1, 7, 12)
Hans Dyvik - trombone (track 1, 7, 12)
Hans Wester - nyckelharpa and keyboards (track 6)
Roger Tallroth - guitar (track 6)
Micke Marin - viola (track 6)
Göran Månsson - flute (track 6)
Mattias Johansson - violin (track 4)
David Bukovinszky - cello (track 4)
Lovisa Hübinette, Clara Hübinette, Anna Wester, Anna Rohlin Larsson, and Klara Motakesi - choir (track 6)

Charts

Weekly charts

Year-end charts

References

Information at Svensk mediedatabas

2009 Christmas albums
Lotta Engberg albums
Christmas albums by Swedish artists
Pop Christmas albums